The 1922 Idaho gubernatorial election was held on November 7, 1922. Republican nominee Charles C. Moore defeated Progressive nominee H. F. Samuels with 39.53% of the vote.

General election

Candidates
Major party candidates
Charles C. Moore, Republican 
Moses Alexander, Democratic

Other candidates
H. F. Samuels, Progressive

Results

References

1922
Idaho
Gubernatorial